Ahmed Bassas (born 22 March 2001), is a Saudi Arabian professional footballer who plays as a midfielder for Saudi Professional League side Al-Ahli.

Career statistics

Club

Notes

References

External links
 

2001 births
Living people
Saudi Arabian footballers
Saudi Arabia youth international footballers
Association football fullbacks
Saudi Professional League players
Al-Ahli Saudi FC players